Mbhashe may refer to a number of things in the Eastern Cape province of South Africa:

 the Mbhashe River, formerly the Bashee River
 the Mbhashe Local Municipality
 the Anglican Diocese of Mbhashe